Encomium is a Latin word deriving from the Ancient Greek enkomion, meaning "the praise of a person or thing." Another Latin equivalent is laudatio, a speech in praise of someone or something. 

Originally was the song sung by the chorus at the κῶμος, or festal procession, held at the great national games in honour of the victor, either on the day of his victory or on its anniversary. The word came afterwards to denote any song written in celebration of distinguished persons, and in later times any spoken or written panegyric whatever.

Encomium also refers to several distinct aspects of rhetoric:

 A general category of oratory
 A method within rhetorical pedagogy
 A figure of speech praising a person or thing, but occurring on a smaller scale than an entire speech
 The eighth exercise in the progymnasmata series
 A literary genre that included five elements: prologue, birth and upbringing, acts of the person's life, comparisons used to praise the subject, and an epilogue
The basilikos logos (imperial encomium), a formal genre in the Byzantine empire

Examples
 Gorgias' famous Encomium of Helen offers several justifications for excusing Helen of Troy's adultery
 In Erasmus' In Praise of Folly, Folly composes an encomium to herself
 De Pippini regis Victoria Avarica is a medieval encomium of the victory of Pepin of Italy over the Avars
 Encomium Emmae Reginae is a medieval encomium of Queen Emma of Normandy
 Laudes Mediolanensis civitatis or Versum de Mediolano civitate is a medieval encomium of Milan
 Versus de Verona is a medieval encomium of Verona
 Polychronion is chanted in the liturgy of Churches which follow the Byzantine Rite
  Paul the Apostle uses a kind of encomium in his praise of love, in 1 Corinthians 13; the prologue is verses 1–3, acts are v. 4–7, comparison is v. 8–12, and epilogue is 13:13–14:1.

References

External links

Public speaking
Rhetorical techniques
Evaluation
Latin words and phrases

de:Laudatio
es:Encomio
fr:Éloge
it:Elogio
nl:Laudatio
pt:Elogio